Frank Robert Hickey (June 9, 1924 – December 9, 2013) was a Canadian football player who played for the Toronto Argonauts and Edmonton Eskimos. He won the Grey Cup with Toronto in 1945 and 1947. Hickey attended the University of Toronto.

References

1924 births
2013 deaths
Edmonton Elks players
Canadian football people from Toronto
Toronto Argonauts players
Players of Canadian football from Ontario
Canadian football running backs
Toronto Varsity Blues football players